Phalium flammiferum, the striped bonnet, is a species of large sea snail, a marine gastropod mollusk in the family Cassidae, the helmet snails and bonnet snails.

Description
These moderately large shells are oval or globular, with a pointed spire and a smooth surface covered with longitudinal brown to pale brown stripes. Outer lip is denticulate, with large brown bands. The aperture is dark brown.

Distribution and habitat
This species has an Indo-Pacific distribution. It can be found from Japan to Vietnam and in Northern China Seas. It prefers fine sandy substratum at depths of 10 to 50 m.

References

Cassidae
Gastropods described in 1798